Moses Nadenbousch House, also known as Red Hill and Woodside Farm, is a historic home located near Martinsburg, Berkeley County, West Virginia. It was built in 1885 and is a -story, five bay, "I"-house wood frame dwelling with Italianate-style details. It is set on a limestone foundation and has an intersecting gable roof.  Also on the property is a shed, large bank barn (1903), and garage.

It was listed on the National Register of Historic Places in 2004.

References

Houses on the National Register of Historic Places in West Virginia
Italianate architecture in West Virginia
Houses completed in 1885
Houses in Berkeley County, West Virginia
National Register of Historic Places in Martinsburg, West Virginia
I-houses in West Virginia